The Schempp-Hirth Mini Nimbus is a 15 Metre-class glider designed and built by Schempp-Hirth GmbH in the late 1970s.

Design and development
In designing the Mini-Nimbus, Klaus Holighaus incorporated the flapped wings from the Glasflügel 303 Mosquito, with the fuselage of the Standard Cirrus. The wings feature trailing edge terminal speed dive brakes-variable camber flaps that limit the vertical dive speed to a maximum  of 70 knots when the dive brakes are fully deployed.

The name "Mini Nimbus" was adopted to distinguish it from longer-wingspan Nimbus models. It first flew on 18 September 1976.

The Mini Nimbus range all feature self-connecting controls, of Glasflügel design, for added safety and ease of rigging, and have been incorporated in all newer Schempp-Hirth models. The trim lever is connected to the flap operating rod and needs to be set only once per flight; thereafter changes in flap setting (-7 to +10 degrees) automatically provides trim compensation.

Variants
Based on the Standard Cirrus, the original Mini-Nimbus HS-7 design had an all-moving tailplane and fibre glass wing spars. A tailplane anti-balance tab was a required modification for certification in the United Kingdom after flight testing by Derek Piggott on behalf of the British Gliding Association  revealed very low stick forces and marginal pitch stability of the HS-7 version. A conventional tail was added for the Mini-Nimbus B version. The conventional horizontal stabiliser/elevator configuration was less sensitive to inputs by the pilot making it easier to fly without constantly making small adjustments to the pitch attitude.  This was due to the much larger control surface of the former compared to the later configuration.

The Mini-Nimbus C version had an increased maximum takeoff weight. Additionally, lighter weight wings with spars and shells of carbon-fibre was available as an option for the C version (meaning that only some Mini Nimbus C has carbon fibre wings, the "C" is often thought to represent "Carbon" which is not correct).

The Nimbus 2C and the Mini Nimbus C were the first two carbon-fibre aircraft to be built by Schempp-Hirth. The use of carbon-fibre significantly lightened the Mini Nimbus improving its climbing performance and increasing water ballast capacity while making assembly and disassembly much easier.

Performance
The Mini-Nimbus glide ratio was somewhat less competitive than its primary rival in sailplane race competitions, the Alexander Schleicher ASW 20.  However its superior climbing performance (altitude gained over time while climbing in lifting air) over its rivals made it the choice of some successful international soaring competition pilots in the late 1970s.

One capability of the Mini Nimbus is its powerful trailing-edge integrated air brake/flap system with a 70 kn terminal dive velocity which gives the aircraft strong short field and steep landing approach capabilities.

Production
159 Mini-Nimbuses were built, many of which remain in use today.

Competition use
George Moffat won the 1977 European Gliding Championships flying a Mini Nimbus  and flew a Mini Nimbus C in the US 15-Meter Gliding Championships.  While no longer considered competitive in the 15-meter class, the Mini Nimbus still competes in the Sports Class of sailplane racing where handicaps are allowed in scoring.

Specifications (Mini-Nimbus C)

See also

References

Notes

Bibliography

 Hardy, Michael. Gliders and sailplanes of the World. London: Ian Allan, 1982.  .

Further reading
Simons M, Segelflugzeuge 1965–2000, Eqip, 2004
Peter F Selinger. "Vom Wolf zum Discus".

External links

Mini-Nimbus Owners Group
British Gliding Association data sheet
Manufacturers type page - German language
Mini Nimbus Yahoo group
Flight test evaluation - Soaring magazine, December 1977
Mini Nimbus production list

Mini-Nimbus
1970s German sailplanes
T-tail aircraft
Aircraft first flown in 1976